Guy III of Spoleto (died 12 December 894) was the margrave of Camerino from 880 and then duke of Spoleto and Camerino from 883. He was crowned king of Italy in 889 and emperor in 891. He died in 894 while fighting for control of the Italian Peninsula.

Guy was married to Ageltrude, daughter of Adelchis of Benevento, who bore him a son named Lambert.

Early life
Guy was the second son of Guy I of Spoleto  and Itta, daughter of Sico of Benevento. Guy I was the son of Lambert I of Nantes and his second wife, Adelaide of Lombardy, who was a daughter of Charlemagne's second eldest son, Pepin of Italy. In 842, the former Duchy of Spoleto, which had been donated to the Papacy by Charlemagne, was resurrected by the Franks to be held against Byzantine catapans to the south, as a Frankish border territory by a dependent margrave.

Consequently, Guy’s family had been important players in Italian politics since the early ninth century.  Although in 876 Guy and his elder brother, Lambert, Duke of Spoleto, had been commissioned by Charles the Bald to accompany Pope John VIII to Naples to break up the alliances that many of the southern Lombard states had made with the Saracens, the family’s interests were generally hostile to the papacy, a policy that Guy initially followed.  

With Lambert’s death in 880, he bequeathed to Guy the march of Camerino, and in 882 Guy supported his nephew Guy II of Spoleto's invasion of the Papal States.   This brought him into conflict with the Emperor Charles the Fat, and in 882, at an assembly at Verona, the emperor dispossessed him of his fiefs, together with a significant number of other important, but minor, Italian nobles.  Rising up in rebellion, Guy allied himself with the neighbouring Saracens and began acquiring further territory. At this point, at a diet at Ravenna, the emperor declared him guilty of high treason, and Berengar of Friuli was commanded to strip him of his fief by force.  

In 883, Guy inherited his nephew's title of Spoleto and reunited the dukedom, henceforth as the "Duchy of Spoleto and Camerino" bearing the title of dux et marchio (and gaining his regnal number III), and by the end of 884, Emperor Charles III was forced to make peace with Guy, where he formally recovered his titles.  Then in 885, he fought his occasional allies, the Saracens of the Garigliano.

Rule as emperor

After the deposition of Charles the Fat in 887, by virtue of being a relative of Archbishop Fulk of Rheims,   he had hopes of being crowned king of West Francia, and in fact travelled as far as Langres, where the bishop crowned him as such. But because of Odo's coronation that year (888), he turned and went back with designs on the crown of Italy and the emperorship.

Guy of Spoleto was opposed by Berengar of Friuli for the Iron Crown of Lombardy.  Although Berengar had the advantage of being allied with the Carolingian family,  and of having been crowned as king of Italy in 887, from 888 Guy was closer to Rome, and had already allied himself with Pope Stephen V, who had described Guy “as his only son”.  Fighting between the rival contenders began, and it was Guy who had himself proclaimed king of Italy in a diet held at Pavia at the end of the year 888.  He was formally crowned King of Italy by Pope Stephen V in 889 in Pavia, in the Basilica of San Michele Maggiore, and this was followed by his coronation as Roman Emperor on 21 February 891, together with the crowning of his son Lambert II as King of Italy.

The situation in Italy began to deteriorate with the election of a new pope, Formosus, in 891. Distrustful of Guy, he began to look elsewhere for support against the emperor, as Guy found it increasingly difficult to end the threat of Berengar who still held out in his Duchy of Friuli.  To bolster his overall position, at Ravenna on 30 April 892, Guy forced Pope Formosus to crown Lambert as co-emperor.  

The pope therefore took the next opportunity to oppose Guy by supporting Arnulf of Carinthia for the Italian and imperial titles. In 893, Formosus invited Arnulf to come to Trento to overthrow Guy and be crowned himself. Arnulf instead sent his son Zwentibold with an army to join Berengar, the deposed king, and march on Trento. Their joint army surrounded Trento, but Guy probably bribed them to leave him unmolested. The following year, they defeated Guy at Bergamo and took Trento and Milan. Berengar was recognised as king and a vassal of Arnulf. Zwentibold returned to Germany, as fever had wreaked havoc on the German armies.   Guy retreated in order to regroup at a fortified place on the Taro and died there suddenly in late autumn, leaving his son under the tutelage of his wife. Both would contest the throne with Berengar and Arnulf.

Legacy

Guy's power never extended over much beyond his hereditary lands, which offered stark illustration of the fact that the imperial title, with its pretensions of universal rule, had by the end of the ninth century become merely a token of the pope's favour, to be fought over by various Italian nobles. He did not even firmly control the north of Italy, battling other claimants over the throne for much of his reign. He did try to maintain the Carolingian tradition and issue capitularies as former emperors had. In 891, he demanded the traditional service in the army of all arimanni, whether they owned land or not.

Sources
di Carpegna Falconieri, Tommaso. "Guido, conte marchese di Camerino, duca marchese di Spoleto, re d'Italia, imperatore". Dizionario Biografico degli Italiani, LXI. Rome: 2004, pp. 354–361.
Mann, Horace, K. The Lives of the Popes in the Early Middle Ages, Vol III: The Popes During the Carolingian Empire, 858–891. 1925
Mann, Horace, K. The Lives of the Popes in the Early Middle Ages, Vol IV: The Popes in the Days of Feudal Anarchy, 891–999. 1925
Comyn, Robert. History of the Western Empire, from its Restoration by Charlemagne to the Accession of Charles V, Vol. I. 1851

References

9th-century births
894 deaths

Year of birth unknown
9th-century Holy Roman Emperors
9th-century kings of Italy
9th-century dukes of Spoleto

Italian monarchs

Guideschi dynasty
Frankish warriors